The Big Chance  is a 1957 West German romantic comedy film directed by Hans Quest and starring  Walter Giller, Gardy Granass and Michael Cramer. Shot and set in Heidelberg, it was one of a series of Schlager music films made around the time.

The film's sets were designed by the art directors Dieter Bartels and Helmut Nentwig. It was shot in Agfacolor.

Main cast 
 Walter Giller as Walter Gerber
 Gardy Granass as Ruth Degner
 Michael Cramer as Manfred Hallersperg
 Wera Frydtberg as Erika Hallersperg
 Robert Freitag as Kaplan Sommer
 Loni Heuser as Henriette 'Henny' Hallersperg
 Käthe Haack as Anna Gerber
 Ernst Waldow as Tankstellenbesitzer Oskar Magenau
 Friedrich Domin as Bischof
 Peter Lühr as Studienrat Heinrich Gerber
 Bruno Fritz as Fabrikant Otto Hallersperg
 Johanna Hofer as Großmutter Degner
 Erna Sellmer as Wirtschafterin Luise
 Gisela Schlüter as Susi Viereck
 Harald Martens as Eugen Gerber
 Renate Danz as Lilli
 Klaus Behrendt as Klaus Pranner
 Willi Schaeffers as Theo Janicke
 Ernst Jacobi as Tommy Reichmann
 Willi Rose as Willi Baumann
 Lou Seitz as Frau Lehmann, Köchin
 Peter Vogel as Peter Fiedler
 Harald Dietl as Heinz
 Kurt Pratsch-Kaufmann as Conferencier
 Freddy Quinn as Freddy

References

Bibliography

External links 
 

West German films
1957 films
1950s German-language films
German romantic comedy films
1957 romantic comedy films
Films directed by Hans Quest
Films set in Heidelberg
1950s German films